Der Scharfe Maxx is a Swiss hard cheese from the canton of Thurgau. It is a hard cows' milk cheese with a pungent taste that is made from thermized milk. The literal translation of "Der Scharfe Maxx" means "the sharp Maxx" or "the spicy Maxx". It is classified as a Swiss-type or Alpine cheese.

The cheese is produced in the Studer cheesery in Hatswil (Hefenhofen) in the canton of Thurgau close to the Lake Constance. The cheesery is run  by the Studer family in the third generation.

The Scharfe Maxx tastes similar to an Appenzeller, but is creamier and more piquant. Similar to other Appenzeller cheeses, the Scharfe Maxx is made with thermized milk.

See also
Culinary Heritage of Switzerland
List of Swiss cheeses

References

External links
 http://www.kaesewelten.info/kasesorten/kuhmilch/der-scharfe-maxx/
 https://stinkybklyn.com/shop/cheese/scharfe-maxx/

Swiss cheeses
Thurgau
Cow's-milk cheeses
Culinary Heritage of Switzerland